George Hanmer Leycester (12 July 1763 — 6 October 1838) was an English amateur cricketer who made 50 known appearances in first-class cricket matches between 1790 and 1808.

Life and cricket
The son of The Reverend Ralph Leycester and Susanna Hanmer, he was born at in July 1763 at Simpson, Buckinghamshire. He was educated at Eton College, before matriculating to Christ Church, Oxford in 1782; however, he gained his degree from Merton College, Oxford in 1788 and his master's in 1790. A student Lincoln's Inn, he was called to the bar in the same year that he gained his master's degree.

Leycester was one of the leading cricketers in the final decade of the 1700s and the first decade of the 1800s. He made his debut in first-class cricket in 1790 for the Marylebone Cricket Club (MCC) against Hornchurch at Lord's Old Ground. Leycester was mainly associated with Surrey and the MCC, but also represented Hampshire, amongst other teams. He was an occasional patron of cricket, his own team appearing in a first-class match in 1802. Leycester played for the Gentlemen in the inaugural and second Gentlemen v Players matches in 1806. In 50 first-class matches, Leycester scored 922 runs at an average of 10.35 with a highest score of 49.

Leycester died at his Portland Place residence in October 1838; he was survived by his widow, Charlotte Jemima.

References

External sources

1763 births
1838 deaths
People from Milton Keynes
People educated at Eton College
Alumni of Christ Church, Oxford
Alumni of Merton College, Oxford
Members of Lincoln's Inn
English barristers
English cricketers
English cricketers of 1787 to 1825
Marylebone Cricket Club cricketers
Old Etonians cricketers
Hampshire cricketers
Surrey cricketers
Hampshire and Marylebone Cricket Club cricketers
Non-international England cricketers
Surrey and Marylebone Cricket Club cricketers
R. Whitehead's XI cricketers
G. Leycester's XI cricketers
Marylebone Cricket Club and Homerton cricketers
Gentlemen cricketers
Lord Frederick Beauclerk's XI cricketers